Odalric, also spelled Odalrih, Odelric, or Udalrich, was the Count of Barcelona, Girona, Roussillon, and Empúries and Margrave of Septimania from 852 to 858. 

Odalric was a Hunfriding, probably the second son of Hunfrid, Margrave of Istria. He had to deal with increasing conflicts with the Muslim kingdoms to the south while the Frankish Empire was suffering succession issues.

Sources
Lewis, Archibald R. The Development of Southern French and Catalan Society, 718–1050. University of Texas Press: Austin, 1965.

9th-century deaths
Counts of Barcelona
Counts of Girona
Counts of Empúries
9th-century people from the County of Barcelona
Year of birth unknown